The 51st District of the Iowa House of Representatives in the state of Iowa.

Current elected officials
Jane Bloomingdale is the representative currently representing the district.

Past representatives
The district has previously been represented by:
 Raymond J. Taylor, 1971–1973
 Donald V. Doyle, 1973–1981
 Al Sturgeon, 1981–1983
 Richard Running, 1983–1989
 Philip Brammer, 1989–1993
 Mary Lundby, 1993–1995
 Rosemary Thomson, 1995–2001
 Jeff Elgin, 2001–2003
 Rod Roberts, 2003–2011
 Dan Muhlbauer, 2011–2013
 Josh Byrnes, 2013–2017
 Jane Bloomingdale, 2017–present

References

051